Adlon is a surname. People with this surname include:

 Lorenz Adlon (1849–1921), German hotelier
 Louis Adlon (1908–1947), German-American film actor in Hollywood
 Percy Adlon (born 1935), German film producer
 Pamela Adlon (born 1966), American film actress

 See also
 Hotel Adlon, Berlin, Germany – built by Lorenz Adlon
 Hotel Adlon, German film 

Surnames of German origin